Horodok is a village in Rivne Raion, Rivne Oblast, Ukraine. In 2001, the community had 2719 residents.

Village remembers Kresowa księga sprawiedliwych on page 87 (Horodok, Rіvne Raion).

Notable people 
Teodor Shteingel was active in the area. He graduated from the University of Kyiv. Then in 1902 he founded the museum in Horodok donating his valuable archaeological, historical and ethnographic collections from Volhynia, the princely tombs excavated century Studynets of the Rivne Oblast.

External links
 Article Gródek (10) in the Geographical Dictionary of the Kingdom of Poland, Volume II (Derenek — Gżack), 1881 year 
 Registration card on the website of the Verkhovna Rada of Ukraine 
 Weather in the Horodok 
 Community residents of the village

References

Villages in Rivne Raion